Breitenburg is a municipality in the district of Steinburg, in Schleswig-Holstein, Germany. It is situated on the river Stör, approx. 4 km southeast of Itzehoe.

Breitenburg is the seat of the Amt ("collective municipality") Breitenburg.

References

Steinburg